The Newmarket Saints are a Junior "B" box lacrosse team based in Newmarket, Ontario, Canada.  The Saints play in the OLA Junior B Lacrosse League. Founded in 1979, the Saints lacrosse club has built a rich history over the last four decades. Initially based out of Scarborough, the team raised its first Founder's Cup in 1985. Seven years later the Saints tasted glory again, winning the 1992 Jr B Championship.

After 21 years, the Saints moved from Scarborough to their current home in Newmarket in 2006.

Hundreds of talented players have proudly worn the red, white and blue team colours, a number of whom went on to play professionally.

2018 marks the 40th season for the Saints lacrosse club.

History

Season-by-season results
Note: GP = Games played, W = Wins, L = Losses, T = Ties, Pts = Points, GF = Goals for, GA = Goals against

External links

The Bible of Lacrosse
Unofficial OLA Page

Ontario Lacrosse Association teams
Sport in Newmarket, Ontario